see also Eye colour#Grey

Grey Eyes is the third studio album by a Canadian indie pop band The Salteens. Released on October 12, 2010, this was a new studio album by the band 7 years after they released their second studio album Let Go of Your Bad Days.

This is the band's first album with Carrie Tennent as a member. Erin Jane, who was in the band for the album Let Go of Your Bad Days, had left the band.

Track listing

All songs by Scott L.D. Walker (SOCAN); except 'Savings and Loans' words by Carrie Tennant, music by Scott L.D. Walker.

Personnel

The Salteens
 Scott Walker - vocals, mandolin, piano
 Carrie Tennant - vocals, piano, clarinet
 Dion Willis - drums, vocals
 Kevin Cooper - double bass, electric bass, vocals
 Robert Calder - trumpet, baritone, flugelhorn

Additional musicians and production

 Alison Gorman - trumpet, baritone, flugelho
 Bryan Milks - tenor sax, clarinet, bass clarinet
 Tim Sars - bari sax, flute
 Carol Dymond- flute
 Todd Simko - guitars on 'Go On' and 'Last Train From London'
 Todd Simko and Scott Walker - producing
 Todd Simko - recording
 Ryan Morey - mastering at Ryebread Mastering
 Shawn Penner and John Raham - engineering at Mushroom Studios and at Ogre Studios respectively

External links
The Salteens-official website 
Scott Walker's interview on the release of Grey Eyes 

The Salteens albums
2003 albums